Myron Herrick "Mike" Palm (November 24, 1899 – April 8, 1974) was a professional American football player in the National Football League (NFL) for the New York Giants. He was also a player-coach in 1933 for the NFL's Cincinnati Reds. He was also the owner and head coach of the Brooklyn-Rochester Tigers of the second American Football League from 1936 to 1937. By 1941, he returned to the Giants, to serve as an assistant coach.

Prior to his professional career, Palm played college football at Pennsylvania State University. He played in the Nittany Lions 4–3 loss to USC in the 1923 Rose Bowl. During the game, he scored Penn State's only points off a field goal. Palm was an assistant at Georgetown University from 1926 to 1929 under coach Lou Little. In 1941 he returned to the Giants and worked as an assistant coach.

References

External links
 

1899 births
1974 deaths
American football halfbacks
American football quarterbacks
Cincinnati Reds (NFL) coaches
Cincinnati Reds (NFL) players
New York Giants coaches
New York Giants players
Penn State Nittany Lions football players
People from St. James, Minnesota
Players of American football from Minnesota